Alexander Sergeyevich Lukomsky (10 July 1868 – 25 January 1939 in Paris) was a Russian military commander, General Staff, Lieutenant-General (April 1916). He fought for the Imperial Russian Army during the First World War and was one of the organizers of Volunteer army during the Russian Civil War.

Lukomsky graduated from Nikolayev Engineering Institute as a military engineer, now Military engineering-technical university (Russian: Военный инженерно-технический университет).

Lukomsky fought alongside Anton Denikin during the Russian Civil War and visited Nikolai Romanov, one of the pretenders to the Tzarist throne following the Iași Conference where nine voted for Denikin compared to four for Nikolai.

References

Recipients of the Order of Saint Stanislaus (Russian)
1868 births
1939 deaths
Military Engineering-Technical University alumni
Imperial Russian Army personnel
Emigrants from the Russian Empire to France